Shaed (stylized SHAED, pronounced "shade") is an American indie pop trio based in Washington, D.C. The group consists of lead vocalist Chelsea Lee and multi-instrumentalists Max and Spencer Ernst. They released their breakthrough single "Trampoline" in June 2018.

History

Twin siblings Max and Spencer Ernst grew up in Silver Spring, Maryland, and showed an interest in music from a very young age. In middle school, they and some friends formed a rock band called Upslide. Upslide performed locally in the Washington, D.C., area for several years, which eventually led the twins to attract the attention of a New York-based management company, Magus Entertainment, who secured them a publishing deal with Cherry Lane Music. While attending Gonzaga College High School, they formed a pop duo called Trust Fall and began touring other parts of the country. Max and Spencer met Chelsea Lee in 2007 while they were performing at the 9:30 Club, a club in Washington DC. Around 2009, Chelsea signed as a solo artist with Atlantic Records. The same year, Max announced his homosexuality to his brother, which was a great liberation for him. In 2010, Chelsea and Spencer both began a romantic relationship.

At the end of high school, the Ernst twins deferred attending college in hopes of getting a record deal with Epic Records. The deal ultimately fell through, and they both went to the University of Maryland in the spring. While attending college, the twins formed a folk rock duo called The Walking Sticks. The Walking Sticks released their debut EP World So Bright on June 27, 2012, when the twins were in their senior year of college. The songs on the album were all recorded live, and featured an acoustic roots rock sound.

Having ended her solo contract with Atlantic Records circa 2011, Lee joined The Walking Sticks sometime after World So Bright was released. In late 2013, The Walking Sticks released their second EP, Send the Night. With this release, the group completely changed their music style, transitioning from folk rock to dream-pop.

In March 2016, The Walking Sticks changed their name to Shaed, in recognition of their new stylistic leanings. They signed with Photo Finish Records by June 2016, and toured with Marian Hill and Vérité in the fall of 2016. In September 2016, Shaed released Just Wanna See, their debut EP under their new name. Their single "Name On It" was the featured track for a Victoria's Secret commercial which debuted on May 15, 2018. In April 2017, Shaed went on tour again as an opener for Bishop Briggs.

In September 2017, the band moved into a house together, and began recording in a home studio for their second EP, Melt. On May 18, 2018, Shaed debuted their first single from the EP, "Trampoline". The group released Melt on September 21, 2018, via Photo Finish Records. On October 30, 2018, Apple debuted their MacBook Air commercial featuring "Trampoline". Chelsea Lee and Spencer Ernst were married in Arlington, Virginia during the first weekend of October 2018.

Their new single "No Other Way" was released on October 16, 2020, via Photo Finish Records.

Chelsea and Spencer welcomed daughter June River on January 29, 2022, according to the band's Instagram page.

Band members
 Chelsea Lee – lead vocals (–present)
 Spencer Ernst – keyboards, drums, guitars, vocals (2011–present)
 Max Ernst – keyboards, drums, guitars, vocals (2011–present)

Discography

Studio albums

Extended plays

Independent extended plays
 World So Bright (2012)
 Send the Night (2013)
 Pop Dreams (2014)

Singles

Notes

References

External links
 

American indie pop groups
Electronic music groups from Washington, D.C.
Electronic music groups from Maryland
2011 establishments in Maryland
2011 establishments in Washington, D.C.
American musical trios
Sibling musical groups